Sharur (also Romanized as Sharūr, Sharoor, and Shorūr; also known as Sharūn) is a village in Bizineh Rud Rural District, Bizineh Rud District, Khodabandeh County, Zanjan Province, Iran. At the 2006 census, its population was 926 and included 204 families.

References 

Populated places in Khodabandeh County